Scorpion, in comics, may refer to:

 Scorpion (Marvel Comics), a number of Marvel Comics comics characters including:
 Mac Gargan, a supervillain and frequent enemy of Spider-Man, the third Venom and a member of the Dark Avengers as the Black Spider-Man, but is back to "being" Scorpion.
 Scorpia (comics), (Elaine Coll), a female version of the Mac Gargan Scorpion.
 Scorpion (Carmilla Black)/Thanasee Rappaccini, first appeared in Amazing Fantasy vol. 2 #7 and was created by Fred Van Lente and Leonard Kirk.
 Ultimate Scorpion, a clone of Ultimate Spider-Man (Peter Parker).
 Silver Scorpion (Elizabeth Barstow) first appeared in Daring Mystery Comics #7 (April 1941).
 Kron Stone, an enemy of Spider-Man 2099, in the Timestorm 2009–2099 alternate reality.
 Scorpion (Atlas/Seaboard Comics), a character from former Marvel Comics publisher Martin Goodman's Atlas/Seaboard Comics
 Scorpion, a Fawcett Comics character from Earth-S who appeared in Captain Marvel
 Le Scorpion, a Belgian comic set in 18th-century Vatican, by Stephen Desberg and Enrico Marini
 Scarlet Scorpion, an AC Comics character

See also
 Scorpion (disambiguation)
 Scorpia (comics), a Marvel Comics supervillainess
 Scorpio (Marvel Comics), a number of Marvel Comics characters with the same alias

References